Sue Allen (born April 17, 1947 in Oskaloosa, Iowa) is an American politician. She was a member of the Missouri House of Representatives from 2009 to 2017. She is a member of the Republican Party.

References

1947 births
21st-century American politicians
21st-century American women politicians
Living people
Republican Party members of the Missouri House of Representatives
People from Oskaloosa, Iowa
People from St. Louis County, Missouri
Women state legislators in Missouri